The 1969 Cupa României Final was the 31st final of Romania's most prestigious football cup competition. It was disputed between Steaua București and Dinamo București, and was won by Steaua București after a game with 3 goals. It was the 9th cup for Steaua București.

Match details

See also 
List of Cupa României finals

References

External links
Romaniansoccer.ro

1969
Cupa
Romania
1969 Cupa Romaniei
FC Steaua București matches